Vanja is a given name. It was originally a nickname for Ivan. 

People with this name include:
Vanja Blomberg (born 1929), Swedish gymnast and Olympic champion
Vanja Džaferović (born 1983), Bosnian and Croatian footballer
Vanja Drach (1932–2009), Croatian actor
Vanja Ejdus (born 1976), Serbian actress
Vanja Gesheva-Tsvetkova (born 1960), Bulgarian sprint canoeist who competed from the late 1970s to the late 1980s
Vanja Grubač (born 1971), Montenegrin footballer
Vanja Iveša (born 1977), Croatian football goalkeeper, currently playing for Eskişehirspor
Vanja Milinković-Savić (born 1997), Serbian footballer
Vanja Rogulj (born 1982), 3-time Olympics breaststroke swimmer from Croatia
Vanja Sutlić (1925–1989), Croatian philosopher
Vanja Udovičić (born 1982), professional water polo player from Serbia

See also 
Vanya (disambiguation)
Wanja, a given name

References 

Slavic masculine given names
Scandinavian feminine given names